KUIS may refer to:

 Kanda University of International Studies
 Kolej Universiti Islam Antarabangsa Selangor